The Seven were rock group from Syracuse,  New York who are remembered for being one of greatest bands of their city. They also had regional hits with "Heat Wave" and "Tell Her No". They were a rock group with elements of jazz and funk.

Background
One of the top Upstate New York acts, the group's roots go back to an outfit called The Upsetters. They were made up of members from Jeff & The Notes and Jimmy Cavallo & The Houserockers, etc.. Guitarist John Latocha left the group and was replaced by Bob Canastraro. They then changed their name to The Magnificent Seven and carried on for about a year until Canastraro was replaced by Chuck Wheeler from a group called Surprise Package. The group then just went by the name, The Seven. Between 1969 & 1972 they were a very popular and well listened to group. The venues the played at included The Place, Campus Inn, Captain Mac's, Ungano's, The Bitter End and The Shack. Their sound has been described as one with heavy rhythm, blasting brass, Latin undercurrents and similar to Blood Sweat & Tears through to Santana.

Career
By the beginning of 1970, the group had already played at the Bitter End in New York, Gilligan's in Buffalo, the Aerodrome in Schenectady and The Club in Rochester.
An article in the January 3 issue of Record World said that the band was in town to cut their first single. The four songs to be recorded were "Song" and "Rachel, both of them originals. The other two were "Heat Wave" which was a hit for Martha and the Vandellas and "Tell Her No" which was a hit for The Zombies.  

In January 1970, their single, "The Song" bw "Heat Wave" was released on Thunderbird TH 534. It was the B side "Heat Wave" which became the hit and that charted for seven weeks on WOLF Radio.

By May, their new album, the song is SONG the album is ALBUM was released on Thunderbird THS 9006. It got a good review. It was just after the album was cut that group member Frank Sgroi contacted Tommy Forest. Sgroi and Forest had played together in a group called Saints And Sinners. He said to Forest that they had got rid of their lead singer and were auditioning lead singers. Forest who was in The Monterays didn't want to leave the group but was happy to come and play a few songs with them. So he did that and sang and played with them for an hour, but the next morning he got a call from Chuck Mellone asking him if he wanted to join the group. So in May, and with new member Forest, they had recently made their debut at Ugano's club and played there for three nights. Among the songs they performed were Rachel" and "Girl, Girl which were from their album. The reviews on their club performance were good with the Record World reviewer saying "though a bit overpowering in intensity, was both innovative and sharp", and Billboard complementing the vocals. 
The group had another regional hit with "Tell Her No" which from July, 1970 spent ten weeks on the WOLF chart.

According Tommy Forest in an interview, the group was supposed to go to England for a thirty day tour and as part of their tour, open a show for The Moody Blues. They also had recording time set up for our second album. Chuck Wheeler the lead guitarist wasn't paid royalties he was owed and left the band. They tried to replace him with a temporary solution but it didn't work out and the group broke up in 1971.

The last recording they made was "Junkyard". It wasn't finished off professionally, but would years later be included on the History of Syracuse album series.

Later years
Some time after the break up of The Seven around 1971 / 1972, Tommy Forest joined the Wilkesbury Brigade which became his last significant musical venture.

With his experience in audio engineering, Chuck Mellone assisted with the debut for radio WCNY-FM on December 4th, 1971. A Some years later he moved to Los Angeles and worked for A&M Records as a studio engineer. In California, the artists he worked with included Hoyt Axton, Glen Campbell and the group, New Riders of the Purple Sage.

In September 2010, John Latocha and Chuck Sgroi were in the State Street Band backing Jimmy Cavallo.

Nick Russo died on October 1st, 2010 at 69 and Chuck Mellone died in Malibu, California on April 7th, 2011. He was 68.

Members
 Bob Canastraro (Magnificent Seven member)
 Tommy Forest
 John Latocha, guitar (Upsetters member)
 Tony Licamele, drums
 Chuck Mellone, organ and group leader
 Al Ruscito, Jr., group spokesman, trombone and trumpet
 Nick Russo, singer and percussion
 Chuck Sgroi, bass
 Frank Sgroi, sax 
 Chuck Wheeler, guitar

Discography

References

External links
 Discogs: The Seven
 History of Syracuse Music: The Seven
 Record World, January 3, 1970: Seven Proves Lucky Group 
 Record World, May 2, 1970: Club Reviews, Promising Seven
 Billboard, May 2, 1970: SEVEN, Ungano's, New York by Fred Kirby
 Eagle News, Apr 17, 2011: Death don’t have no mercy… By Russ Tarby (article about Chuck Mellone 
 The Seven: "Heat Wave" 

Rock music groups from New York (state)
Musical groups from Syracuse, New York
Musical groups disestablished in 1971
Thunderbird Records artists